Reinhard Richard Breinburg (born May 2, 1984 in Purmerend, Netherlands) is a naturalized Aruban football defender, who plays for SV Dakota.

Club career
He played in the Feyenoord academy and joined Dordrecht in 2004. At Dordrecht, Breinburg was tested positive for use of an illegal substance. He was later suspended by the Dutch FA for use of cannabis. In 2010, he joined amateur side Barendrecht and he moved to Quick Boys two years later.

He left Quick Boys in 2014 and moved to Aruba to work on the island.

International career
Breinburg made his debut for Aruba in a December 2011 friendly match against Suriname and earned a total of 13 caps scoring no goals.

References

External links

 Profile at VI

1984 births
Living people
People from Purmerend
Dutch people of Aruban descent
Association football central defenders
Dutch footballers
Aruban footballers
Aruba international footballers
Aruban expatriate footballers
Expatriate footballers in the Netherlands
Eerste Divisie players
FC Dordrecht players
BVV Barendrecht players
Quick Boys players
SV Dakota players
Doping cases in association football
Dutch sportspeople in doping cases
Footballers from North Holland